Monteoru River can refer to one of the following rivers in Romania:

 Monteoru - headwater of the Sărățel in Vrancea County
 Monteoru - tributary of the Siriul Mare in Buzău County
 Valea Monteorului River

See also 
 Monteoru